From the league's inception in 2008 there have always been team changes in the Kontinental Hockey League between seasons, as some new teams have joined the league or others have left it. There is no promotion/relegation system with the VHL in place like there was with the Superleague and Vysshaya Liga. The number of teams in the league stayed at 24 throughout the first two seasons. In the third season the number of teams was reduced to 23 because Budivelnyk, a team that planned to join the league, dropped out before the start of the season. Initially, Lev Poprad replaced Budivelnyk to retain the number of teams at 24. However, Lev was excluded by the KHL before the start of that season, but would be accepted into the league for 2011–12. The league plans to expand this number for future seasons.

The inaugural season of KHL included all 20 teams of the 2007–08 Russian Superleague. Non–Russian teams Barys Astana, Dinamo Riga and Dinamo Minsk also joined the newly formed league. Likewise, the recreated team of Khimik Voskresensk, the champion of the 2007–08 season of the Major League, joined. Thus the initial number of teams was 24.

Team changes by season

Division lineup changes

References

 
team changes